The Half Dozen Group of Artists is an art society based in Brisbane, Queensland, Australia. Established in 1941, the group encourages the development of local artists and holds an annual exhibition in Brisbane.

History
The society was founded on 9 April 1941 by six artists, led by Lilian Pedersen. Its patron was James Vincent Duhig.

The Group was based for many years at an art studio in Kangaroo Point, Brisbane. It now operates workshops from a studio at 37 Quarry Rd, Sherwood.

Founding members included sculptor Lewis Jarvis Harvey.

In 2021 the Half Dozen Group of Artists Inc. celebrates its 80th birthday. The Annual Exhibition continues as a major feature of its history and events.

References

Art societies
Australian artist groups and collectives
1940 establishments in Australia
Arts organizations established in 1940
Organisations based in Brisbane